In the Ottoman and Turkish worlds, a yer sofrası is traditionally a low table or tray used as a dining table. In modern Turkish language sofra means a table prepared or set for eating a meal.

References

Bibliography
 Marianna Yerasimos, 500 Years of Ottoman Cuisine, 2003, 
 Metin Saip Sürücüoğlu, "Kitchen Organization, Ceremonial and Celebratory Meals in the Ottoman Empire"
 Ronald T. Marchese, The fabric of life: cultural transformations in Turkish society
 Suraiya Faroqhi, Subjects of the Sultan: culture and daily life in the Ottoman Empire
 Mehrdad Kia, Daily Life in the Ottoman Empire

Turkish culture